A connective tissue neoplasm or connective tissue tumor is a neoplasm arising from the tissues of the connective tissue. (Not all tumors in the connective tissue are of the connective tissue.)

References

External links 

Anatomical pathology
Tissues (biology)
Connective and soft tissue neoplasms